Mark Volders (born 13 April 1977 in Xanten) is a Belgian football goalkeeper.

References

External links 
 League Stats
 Players Data
 R.E. Mouscron Profile

1977 births
Association football goalkeepers
Belgian footballers
Belgian expatriate footballers
Royal Excel Mouscron players
RBC Roosendaal players
K.S.K. Beveren players
K.R.C. Genk players
Living people
K.F.C. Dessel Sport players
Sint-Truidense V.V. players
Belgian Pro League players
Eredivisie players
Expatriate footballers in the Netherlands
K.F.C. Lommel S.K. players